Nemonoxacin is a non-fluorinated quinolone antibiotic undergoing clinical trials. It has the same mechanism of action as fluouroquinolones; it inhibits DNA gyrase, preventing DNA synthesis, gene duplication, and cell division. At the end of 2016, it had reached market in Taiwan, Russia, the Commonwealth Independent States, Turkey, mainland China, and Latin America under the brand name Taigexyn. Nemonoxacin has completed phase 2 trials in the US and has moved on to phase 3 trials. The U.S. Food and Drug Administration (FDA) has granted nemonoxacin qualified infectious disease product (QIDP) and fast track designations for community-acquired bacterial pneumonia (CAP) and acute bacterial skin and skin-structure infections (ABSSSI).

Nemonoxacin has a broad spectrum of activity against Gram-positive, Gram-negative, and atypical pathogens, including activity against methicillin-resistant Staphylococcus aureus (MRSA) (MIC90  1 g/ml) and vancomycin-resistant pathogens. However, it was less active against Gram-negative pathogens such as Escherichia coli, Proteus mirabilis, and Pseudomonas aeruginosa, with MIC90 values of 32, 16, and 32 g/ml, respectively. The new drug also is effective against C.difficile isolates that are resistant to other quinolones, and is more potent than levofloxacin or moxifloxacin.

References

Cyclopropanes
Piperidines
Quinolone antibiotics
Carboxylic acids
Phenol ethers